Sullah is a village in Kharian Tehsil, Gujrat District, Punjab, Pakistan approximately 17 km from Kotla Arab Ali Khan and 5 km from Awan Sharif. Kashmir is in east side from it.

References

Villages in Kharian Tehsil
Villages in Gujrat District